"23rd Monster" is a song by Japanese singer-songwriter Ayumi Hamasaki. It was released as a digital single only on April 8, 2021, marking the singer's 23rd anniversary since her debut with the single Poker Face in 1998.

The song debuted at number 2 on the Oricon Daily Digital Singles Chart upon release, and peaked at number 29 on the Oricon Weekly Digital Singles Chart.

Background
On April 7, 2021, it was announced that a new song called "23rd Monster" would be released as a digital single on April 8, 2021, to commemorate the singer's 23rd anniversary.

Initially, Hamasaki wanted to announce the song on April 8 at midnight. However, she decided to reveal the information on April 7, at 10pm. This was caused by people overseas being able to hear the song earlier, which resulted in information about the song spreading online before the planned announcement.

Writing and production
The song's lyrics were written by Hamasaki while composition was handled by Kazuhiro Hara.

Lyrically, the song is about choosing your own path in life, while also dealing with the current social situation.

Release
The song was released on digital platforms and streaming services at midnight on April 8, 2021.

Music video
A video titled "浜崎あゆみ / 23rd Monster (MV teaser -episode 0-)" was also uploaded on Hamasaki's official YouTube channel on April 8, 2021, at midnight. It lasts one minute and 21 seconds, and was described to feature a "mysterious countdown", as well as dancers performing "an aggressive choreography." The music video for the song was released on June 18, 2021.

Promotion
The song was performed for the first time on TV on the first night of FNS Laugh and Music Festival on August 28th, 2021.

Commercial performance
The song debuted at number two on the Oricon Daily Digital Single Chart with 2,276 copies sold. With four day's worth of sales due to its being released in the middle of the charting week, it entered the Oricon Weekly Digital Singles Chart at number 29, having sold 3,236 downloads.

Additionally, "23rd Monster" debuted at 30 on the Billboard Japan Top Download Songs chart.

Track listing

Digital download

Charts

References

2021 songs
Japanese songs
J-pop songs